The following highways are numbered 621:

Costa Rica
 National Route 621

United Kingdom

United States